Attock Bridge is situated between Attock Khurd and Khairabad Kund on Indus river in Pakistan.  It is commonly known as "Old Attock Bridge". This bridge is one of the most important strategic and commercial crossing on the Indus River between Punjab and Khyber Pakhtunkhwa provinces, hence was heavily fortified.

History
It was originally designed by Sir Guildford Molesworth and was opened to traffic on 24 May 1883. The cost of construction was more than Rs 3.2 million.

The structure was redesigned by Sir Francis Callaghan and was reconstructed in 1929, at the cost of Rs 2.5 million. The upper level is use for railway traffic and lower level was used for road traffic. The approaches to the bridge were built as solid fortifications - as a defense against raids from nearby Pashtun tribesmen.

This bridge was a part of famous Grand Trunk Road. In 1979 a new bridge was constructed and road traffic was shifted to there. This new bridge is known as "New Attock Bridge".

References 

Bridges over the Indus River
Attock District
Railway bridges in Pakistan
Bridges in Pakistan